Georgi Stanchev (born 27 August 1985, in Varna) is a Bulgarian football striker currently playing for Suvorovo.

Career
Stanchev was raised in Spartak Varna's youth teams, but in 2004 signed his first professional contract with Kaliakra Kavarna.

Club statistics
As of 1 June 2011

References

External links
 

1985 births
Living people
Bulgarian footballers
Sportspeople from Varna, Bulgaria
Association football forwards
PFC Kaliakra Kavarna players
PFC Spartak Varna players
PFC Dobrudzha Dobrich players
First Professional Football League (Bulgaria) players